Alexandra Jones is a historical archaeologist and educator. She is founder and chief executive officer of Archaeology in the Community, "a Washington, D.C.-based nonprofit that aims to increase awareness of archaeology and history." 
She worked on the PBS television program, Time Team America, as Field Director of Archaeology for in 2013.

Early life and education

Jones attended Howard University, earning two B.A. degrees in history and anthropology in 2001 and an M.A degree in history in 2003. She earned a PhD in historical archaeology from the University of California, Berkeley

While attending Berkeley, Jones participated in a community outreach project that was required of all students. Her outreach participation involved working with a local school, teaching archaeology to sixth grade students. When her project was completed, she asked her community service advisor for permission to conduct the next year's project in her hometown of Washington D.C. Jones was granted permission and given funds for her community outreach activities on the East Coast. That experience inspired Jones to create the business she founded in 2009.

Career

Jones founded Archaeology in the Community in 2009. Her organization works with local schools in the Washington D.C. and Maryland areas, conducting educational programs in archaeology. The organization also works with undergraduate students who are studying anthropology and sponsors community events which actively encourage the interest and understanding of archaeology.

Jones worked on season two of PBS’s Time Team America, a television program about archaeology.  As Field Director of Archaeology on the televisIon show, Jones worked with middle and high school students  at different archaeological sites around the U.S.

References 

American women archaeologists
African-American archaeologists
Howard University alumni
UC Berkeley College of Letters and Science alumni
Living people
American archaeologists
1977 births
21st-century African-American people
21st-century African-American women
20th-century African-American people
20th-century African-American women